The 2008–09 season was Bolton Wanderers 10th season in the Premier League, and their eighth consecutive season in the top division of English football and covers the period from 1 July 2008 to 30 June 2009. As they failed to win the 2008–09 Premier League title it was the 70th time that they have competed at the top level without winning the title, the most of any club.

The team kit for the 2008–09 season was produced by Reebok who were also the shirt sponsor. Unlike previous seasons, the new kit did not debut in the final home game of the 07–08 season. The new home kit is predominantly white with a blue upper third going over the shoulders. The new away kit is predominantly yellow with the same style over the shoulders, this time green. Due to no other club playing in a kit similar to the away design, no third choice kit was needed.

Pre-season
Bolton signed Fabrice Muamba from relegated Birmingham City for £5m and broke the club transfer fee record to sign Johan Elmander from Toulouse FC for £8.2m in a deal which saw Daniel Braaten move the other way as a makeweight. Riga Mustapha and Danny Shittu were also signed for undisclosed figures. Both Iván Campo and Stelios Giannakopoulos did not have their contracts renewed, leading Campo to write a public letter to Bolton fans on a website, expressing his regret at not being able to say goodbye to them. He would later join Ipswich Town whilst Stelios joined Hull City. Andranik Teymourian also left on a free, joining Fulham, Abdoulaye Méïté joined recently promoted West Bromwich Albion for £2m and El Hadji Diouf made good his promise that he would leave the club by joining Sunderland for £2.6m.

Bolton kicked off their pre-season programme by drawing 0–0 at local rivals Rochdale. Their next pre-season friendly, away to Tranmere Rovers was postponed due to a waterlogged pitch. A convincing 5–0 defeat of Doncaster Rovers by a mostly first team squad was followed the next day by a mostly reserve squad beating local team Chorley 2–0. Pre-season was completed by a mini-tour of Greece, drawing 1–1 against previous UEFA Cup opponents Aris Thessaloniki before losing to AEK Athens 1–0.

Premier League

Bolton got off to a winning start in the league opener at the Reebok Stadium against newly promoted Stoke City on 16 August, Gretar Steinsson and Kevin Davies scoring before Johan Elmander scored a debut goal in a 3–1 victory.

A week later Bolton travelled to Newcastle United but left with a 1–0 defeat. This was followed four days later by a home 2–1 Carling Cup defeat to League One side Northampton Town, a result not helped by the sending off of Gary Cahill. Bolton's first goalless draw of the season followed when West Bromwich Albion visited The Reebok.

After an international break, Bolton returned to action by facing Fulham at Craven Cottage but performed poorly in another 2–1 defeat, Kevin Davies scoring late on. Davies scored again a week later when Arsenal visited the Reebok Stadium but it was not enough in a 3–1 defeat. A third consecutive defeat came at Premier League champions Manchester United, a converted penalty, given in controversial circumstances, one of the goals in a 2–0 defeat.

Bolton's second victory of the season came in the live game at West Ham on 4 October, Gary Cahill and a thirty five-yard free kick from Matthew Taylor adding to Kevin Davies' fourth goal of the season. 
A week later the local derby against Blackburn brought Bolton their second goalless draw.

The first reported murmurings of discontent amongst the fans against the manager followed a 2–0 defeat at Tottenham Hotspur in Harry Redknapp's first game in charge of the home team on 26 October. and the team were jeered off after a last minute goal consigned them to another defeat on 29 October, 1–0 at home to Everton.

The pressure was eased somewhat with a 2–0 derby victory over Manchester City on 2 November, a Richard Dunne own-goal adding to Ricardo Gardner's first league goal in six years. The match marked Jussi Jääskeläinen's 400th game for the club. A second successive win followed the week after, 1–0 away at Hull City and although a 2–0 followed at home to Liverpool, two more victories away at Middlesbrough and Sunderland brought the manager his first manager of the month award in the Premier League.

Winning the award seemed to have a detrimental effect on the team as two successive defeats followed to high flying Chelsea and Aston Villa. The club's only victory of the month, 2–1 at home to Portsmouth was followed by two more defeats, a Boxing Day loss away to Liverpool and two days later at home to local rivals Wigan Athletic.

The New Year commenced with an early FA Cup defeat away to Sunderland. A week later Bolton held out for 84 minutes before losing 1–0 away at Arsenal. Another conceded late goal at home to Manchester United, this time in the 90th minute, made it four losses in a row but the run halted in the next game, a 2–2 draw away at Blackburn Rovers, now managed by former Bolton manager Sam Allardyce, although Bolton had been two goals up with half an hour left. A similar fate almost befell the team in the next home game against Tottenham Hotspur, Darren Bent scoring twice in two minutes to cancel out early goals from Sébastien Puygrenier and Kevin Davies. However, a late Davies goal gave Bolton their first win in more than a month.

The January transfer window saw three new players arrive and one player leave. Kevin Nolan, the team captain for three years, was sold to Newcastle United for £4,000,000. Kevin Davies replaced him as captain. Mark Davies arrived from Wolves for £1,200,000 and two loan signings, Puygrenier and Ariza Makukula arrived from Zenit St. Petersburg and Benfica respectively.

Due to international fixtures and the club's early departure from the FA Cup, only two games were played in February, a 3–0 away defeat to Everton and a 2–1 victory over West Ham, Bolton completing a double over the London side. Kevin Davies' goal in this game gave him his best ever goal haul for the season in league games in the top flight. He would go on to score twice more and finished the season as the club's leading marksman.

March saw four points collected, through a 1–0 victory over Newcastle United and a 1–1 draw at West Bromwich. These results bookended two successive defeats, a 2–0 away defeat to Stoke City and a 3–1 reverse to Fulham.

In April, a 4–1 win over Middlesbrough at the Reebok Stadium at the very beginning of the month would prove to be Bolton's last victory of the season. The week after, a visit to Chelsea saw Bolton recover from four goals down to almost snatch a draw, an injury time shot by Gary Cahill being cleared off the Chelsea line. A 1–0 result at Portsmouth was then followed by four successive draws stretching into May, Aston Villa, Sunderland and Hull City taking points at the Reebok whilst a local derby at Wigan Athletic. The season finished with a 1–0 derby defeat at Manchester City

Matches

Results by matchday

Table

FA Cup

League Cup

Squad statistics

Statistics accurate as of match played 24 May 2009

Transfers

In

Out

Loan in

Loan out

Kit Profile

|
|
|}

References

External links
 Official Site: 2008/2009 Fixtures & Results
 BBC Sport – Club Stats
 Soccerbase – Results | Squad Stats | Transfers

 

2008–09 Premier League by team
2008–09